This is a list of places named after casualties of the 2010 Polish Air Force Tu-154 crash. This list includes only name changes that were accepted, e.g. by city councils.

Streets

Georgia
Lech Kaczyński Street ( – Lekh Kachinskis Kucha) in Tbilisi 
Lech and Maria Kaczyński Street ( – Lekh da Maria Kachinskebis Kucha) in Batumi 
Lech and Maria Kaczyński Street ( – Lekh da Maria Kachinskebis Kucha) in Gori

Lithuania
Lech Kaczynski Street in Vilnius

Moldova
Lech Kaczyński Street in Chişinau

Poland
Maciej Płażyński Roundabout (Rondo Płażyńskiego) in Sopot
President Ryszard Kaczorowski Street (Ulica Prezydenta Ryszarda Kaczorowskiego), in Kielce
Ryszard Kaczorowski Roundabout (Rondo Ryszarda Kaczorowskiego) in Piastow
Ryszard Kaczorowski Street (Ulica Ryszarda Kaczorowskiego) in Białystok
Ryszard Kaczorowski Street (Ulica Ryszarda Kaczorowskiego) in Siedlce

Lech Kaczyński Avenue (Aleja Lecha Kaczyńskiego) in Lubin
Lech Kaczyński Roundabout (Rondo Lecha Kaczyńskiego) in Starachowice
Lech Kaczyński Street (Ulica Lecha Kaczyńskiego) in Siedlce
Lech and Maria Kaczyńscy roundabout in Tomaszów Mazowiecki
Lech Kaczyński Street (Ulica Lecha Kaczyńskiego) in Tomaszow Lubelski
Maria and Lech Kaczyński Boulevard (Bulwar Marii i Lecha Kacyńskich) in Wrocław
President Lech Kaczyński Street (Ulica Prezydenta Lecha Kaczyńskiego) in Kielce
Tunnel of the Presidential Couple Lech and Maria Kaczyński (Tunel Pary Prezydenckiej Lecha i Marii Kaczyńskich) on the S7 expressway in Jordanów municipality

Former
Lech Kaczyński Street (Ulica Lecha Kaczyńskiego) in Warsaw (given this name in 2017 but reverted to former name of Aleja Armii Ludowiej in 2018)

Ukraine
Lech Kaczyński Street (  – Vulitsa Lekha Kachyns'koho) in Odesa 
Lech Kaczyński Street ( – Vulitsa Lekha Kachyns'koho) in Khmelnytskyi 
Lech Kaczyński Street ( – Vulitsa Lekha Kachyns'koho) in Zhytomyr 
Lech Kaczyński Street ( – Vulitsa Lekha Kachyns'koho) in Bucha

Bridges

Poland
President Lech Kaczyński Bridge (Most im. Prezydenta RP Lecha Kaczyńskiego) in Bydgoszcz

Squares and parks

Georgia
Lech Kaczyński Park ( – Lekh Kachinskis Skveri) in Tbilisi

Poland
Lech and Maria Kaczyński Park (Park im. Lecha i Marii Kaczyńskich) in Sopot
Arkadiusz Rybicki Square (Skwer im. Arkadiusza Rybickiego) in Sopot

References

Smolensk air disaster
Places named after casualties of the Smolensk air disaster